The discography of British-American band Fleetwood Mac consists of 18 studio albums, nine live albums, 23 compilation albums, one extended play and 62 singles. The band also has sold over 120 million records worldwide, making them one of the best-selling music artists of all time.

The 1967–1969 era Blue Horizon albums (Fleetwood Mac, Mr. Wonderful, The Pious Bird of Good Omen, and Fleetwood Mac in Chicago) and the 1971 outtakes album The Original Fleetwood Mac have been remastered and reissued on CD, as have the 1975–1987 era Warner Bros. studio albums (Fleetwood Mac, Rumours, Tusk, Mirage, and Tango in the Night). In 2020, the remaining albums from 1969 to 1974 (Then Play On, Kiln House, Future Games, Bare Trees, Penguin, Mystery to Me, and Heroes are Hard to Find) were remastered and released in a CD box set, which also included a previously unreleased live concert from 15 December 1974.

In 2013, a deluxe edition of Rumours was released. The same year, Then Play On was remastered and reissued on CD. Reissues of Then Play On, Kiln House, Future Games and Bare Trees were released on vinyl, initially bundled with a 7″ single of "Oh Well, Parts I & II", then released separately in 2014.  In 2015, a five-CD/one-DVD/two-LP deluxe edition, a three-CD expanded edition, plus a one-CD remaster of Tusk was released. In 2016, multiple remastered editions of Mirage were released. A 30th anniversary edition of Tango in the Night was released 31 March 2017.

In November 2017, the band announced a deluxe reissue of their 1975 self-titled album. The reissue featured a remastered version of the original album along with outtakes, alternative versions, and live recordings. The repackage was officially released worldwide on 19 January 2018.

Albums

Studio albums

Live albums

Notes
A  Live in Boston has been re-released several times: as Live in Boston: Remastered (3CD) in 1998; Boston Blues (2CD) in 2000; Live at the Boston Tea Party (4LP) in 2003; and as Boston (3CD) in 2013.
B  The tracks from In Concert were originally released on the deluxe 2015 remaster of Tusk.

Compilation albums

Notes
A  Albatross was credited to both Fleetwood Mac and Christine Perfect with side A consisting of early tracks by Fleetwood Mac and side B consisting of tracks by Christine Perfect.
B  25 Years – The Chain was released as both a two-disc and four-disc box set.
C  Four single-disc releases of material from the Madison Blues three-disc box set have been released: Perfect Days (2008) and Perfect in Every Way (2010) are identical compilations of tracks from the original set; while Crazy About the Blues (2010) and Preaching the Blues (2011) are identical to discs one and two of Madison Blues respectively.
D  In 2005, a three-disc set titled Men of the World: The Early Years was released, consisting of material from The Vaudeville Years and Show-Biz Blues.

Extended plays

Singles

Notes

Billboard Year-End performances

Other charted and certified songs

Videography

Home video albums
Documentary and Live Concert (1981)
Mirage Tour (1983)
Tango in the Night Tour (1988)
The Early Years 1967–1970 (1994)
The Dance (1997)
Classic Albums: Rumours (1997)
Live in Boston (2004)
Destiny Rules (2004)
Don't Stop (2009)
Rumours: 35th Anniversary Edition Disc 3: The Rosebud Film (2013)
Tango in the Night: Deluxe Edition Disc 4: Promotional Videos (2017)

Music videos
1976 – "Rhiannon" (performance clip)
1977 – "Go Your Own Way" (performance clip)
1977 – "Dreams" (performance clip)
1977 – "Don't Stop" (performance clip)
1977 – "You Make Loving Fun" (performance clip)
1979 – "Tusk"
1979 – "Sara" (performance clip)
1979 – "Not That Funny" (performance clip)
1982 – "Hold Me"
1982 – "Gypsy"
1982 – "Oh Diane" (performance clip)
1987 – "Big Love"
1987 – "Seven Wonders"
1987 – "Little Lies"
1987 – "Family Man"
1987 – "Everywhere" (Version 1)
1987 – "Everywhere" (Version 2 with Band)
1988 – "Isn't It Midnight" (performance clip)
1988 – "As Long as You Follow"
1990 – "Save Me"
1990 – "In the Back of My Mind"
1990 – "Skies the Limit"
1992 – "Love Shines"
1992 – "Paper Doll"
1997 – "Silver Springs" (performance clip)
1997 – "The Chain" (performance clip)
1997 – "Temporary One" (performance clip)
1997 – "Landslide" (performance clip)
2003 – "Peacekeeper" (performance clip)
2003 – "Say You Will" (performance clip)

References

External links
 

Discography
Discographies of British artists
Discographies of American artists
Rock music group discographies